Desna Raion is a name of several city districts in Ukraine

 Desnianskyi District, Chernihiv
 Desnianskyi District, Kyiv